Joseph S. Whiteford (born October 1859) was an American politician from Maryland. He served as a member of the Maryland House of Delegates, representing Harford County, from 1908 to 1909.

Early life
Joseph S. Whiteford was born in October 1859 near Whiteford, Maryland, to Elizabeth Whiteford.

Career
Whiteford ran a dairy farm and worked in the canning industry.

Whiteford was a Democrat. He served as a member of the Maryland House of Delegates, representing Harford County, from 1908 to 1909.

Personal life
Whiteford married the daughter of Foulk Jones around 1884. They had two sons, Roger and Guy.

In 1916, Whiteford was arrested for an automobile crash into a street car, but the charges were dismissed.

References

1859 births
Year of death missing
People from Harford County, Maryland
Democratic Party members of the Maryland House of Delegates
Farmers from Maryland